Superbird-B2, also known by its pre-launch designation Superbird-4, is a Japanese communications satellite which is operated by SKY Perfect JSAT Group. It was originally built and launched for the Space Communications Corporation (SCC), which merged with JSAT Corporation (JSAT) in October 2008. It was constructed by Hughes Space and Communications and is based on the HS-601 HP satellite bus.

Satellite 
Space Communications Corporation (SCC) of Tokyo, Japan, ordered its second spacecraft from Hughes Space and Communications (HSC), on 6 April 1998. It was built at the Los Angeles plant, California, United States.

Launch 
Launch occurred on 18 February 2000, at 01:04 UTC. The launch was contracted by Arianespace, and used an Ariane 44LP H10-3 launch vehicle flying from ELA-2 at the Centre Spatial Guyanais. Following its launch and on-orbit testing, it was placed in geostationary orbit at 162° East, from where it provides communications services to Japan. It is equipped with thirty five transponders. Currently, the J-Alert (Japanese emergency warning system) is broadcast via Superbird-B2.

References 

Communications satellites in geostationary orbit
Satellites using the BSS-601 bus
Spacecraft launched in 2000
Communications satellites of Japan
2000 in Japan